Starokangyshevo (İśke Käñgeş) is a rural locality (a selo) in Mayadykovsky Selsoviet, Dyurtyulinsky District, Bashkortostan, Russia. The population was 125 as of 2010. There are 5 streets.

Geography 
Starokangyshevo is located 25 km northeast of Dyurtyuli (the district's administrative centre) by road. Mayadyk is the nearest rural locality.

References 

Rural localities in Dyurtyulinsky District